James Sheehan may refer to:

Jim Sheehan (1885–1967), Australian politician
James Sheehan (Rhode Island politician) (born 1966), American state legislator in Rhode Island
James J. Sheehan (born 1937), historian of Germany
James Sheehan (artist) (born 1964), contemporary American artist
Jim Sheehan (baseball) (1913–2003), Major League Baseball catcher